The Dominican Ambassador to Chile is in charge of the Dominican Republic's diplomatic mission to Chile. The official title is The Ambassador Extraordinary and Plenipotentiary to Chile. 

The ambassador's residence is on Candelaria Goyenechea 4153, Vitacura in Santiago de Chile.

The current Ambassador, as 25 October 2009, Pablo Arturo Maríñez, was appointed on March, 2009.

List of ambassadors 
Theis list is incomplete.

 Patricio Badía Lara (1994-?) 
 Miguel Angel Velazquez Mainardi (2004–2005) (died in office) 
 Cesar Medina (2005-2008) 
 Pablo Arturo Maríñez (2009-)

References

Chile
Dominican Republic